Lucien Plourde (born 27 March 1930) was a Ralliement Créditiste and Social Credit party
member of the House of Commons of Canada. He was a grocer and teacher by career.

He was first elected at the Quebec West riding in the 1962 general election under the Social Credit party banner and re-elected there in 1963 under the Ralliement créditiste, following Plourde's support of Réal Caouette during the Social Credit party split. Plourde was defeated in the 1965 election by Jean Marchand of the Liberal party.

External links
 

1930 births
Living people
Members of the House of Commons of Canada from Quebec
Ralliement créditiste du Québec politicians
Social Credit Party of Canada MPs